Patrick Kelly Downard is the former Republican Councilman for the 16th District of Louisville Metro in Kentucky in the United States of America and served as Metro Council President from 2004 to 2005. Downard previously held the title of President of Louisville Community Development Bank, to which he was appointed by Mayor Jerry E. Abramson. Before being appointed by Abramson, Downard (who is a Certified Public Accountant) held the titles of President of the PNC Mortgage Company and Senior Vice President of PNC Private Banking. In 2005, Downard filed to be a candidate in the 2006 Louisville Metro Mayor election.

He was raised in Indian Hills, Kentucky, a suburb of Louisville, and has moved back to the area as an adult. His grandfather, C. Paul Downard, worked for a retail coal company, and served as president of the former Louisville Board of Aldermen. Downard's father, Norman, was president of a coal mining and mining equipment company, P&D Coal Mining Co. Inc.

Downard graduated from St. Xavier High School in 1964, also graduated from the University of Dayton School of Business Administration and earned a Master of Business Administration from Bellarmine University. A Roman Catholic, Downard and his wife, Denise, have two daughters and a son.

Downard's 2006 Mayoral campaign was an underdog one, Abramson was a long-time mayor of the city and had wide name recognition, and most polls showed his approval rating at around 80%. Downard ran his campaign based on promises to improve the local economy and increase funding for public safety, saying that under Abramson the city had slipped in both areas and was lagging behind nearby cities like Cincinnati and Indianapolis.

Downward was defeated in the election, receiving 76,423 votes (31%) to Abramson's 164,414 (67%). Although Downward was endorsed by police officers and firefighters, the Courier-journal reported that his message that Abramson was soft on crime and economic issues failed to reach voters, saturated by other ads of, among other things, five congressional races in the Louisville television market. Nevertheless, Downward was arguably the most serious challenger Abramson had yet faced in the mayoral race.

References

External links 
 Kelly Downard for Mayor
 Council Website

Louisville Metro Council members
Kentucky Republicans
University of Dayton alumni
Bellarmine University alumni
Living people
21st-century American politicians
Year of birth missing (living people)